Arreton is a village and civil parish in the central eastern part of the Isle of Wight, England. It is about 3 miles south east of Newport.

Name
The settlement has had different names and different spellings over the years. For example, the village was called Adrintone in the 11th century, Arreton in the 12th century, Artone in the 13th century, Atherton and Adherton in the 14th century, Adderton in the 16th century, and Aireton in the 17th century.

Description

The village has two inns with a long history. The White Lion Inn has been in business for two centuries, and was a staging inn on the A3056 road between Newport and Sandown. At one time, there was a Red Lion Inn nearby. The Arreton Barns Craft Village commercial complex contains a pub called "The Dairyman's Daughter", named after a best selling book about a girl (Elizabeth Wallbridge) from Arreton by Rev. Legh Richmond.

Arreton is home to the Shipwreck Centre and Maritime Museum, which moved to the Arreton Barns Complex from Bembridge after 26 years.
It is housed in a "Grade II stone barn" at Jacob's Yard in the Arreton Barns Centre. Visitors to the Shipwreck Centre can buy a variety of souvenirs and salvaged objects, including Copper ingots from a Victorian steamer ship which capsized off the coast nearby.

St. George's Church, Arreton is renowned. The war memorial was designed by local architect, Percy Stone (1856–1934). On the road to the church is the 17th century Stile Cottage which was previously used to store ales for the church.

Opposite the church is the Island Brass Rubbing Centre, Lavender Cottage (which sells lavender products) and a wood carving of St. George and the dragon by local sculptor Paul Sivell.

Arreton Manor, the local manor house, was rebuilt between 1595 and 1612 by Sir Humphrey Barnet. Arreton Manor is mentioned in the Domesday Book (1086) and has been owned by at least eight monarchs, the earliest being King Alfred the Great who left it in his will to his youngest son Aethelweard. King Charles I reviewed troops on the lawn in 1629, and Queen Victoria planted a tree in the garden.

There are or were several ancient mills in Arreton. The mill at Horringford was apparently a paper mill.

To the north of the village lies Arreton Down, a Site of Special Scientific Interest.

There is also a zoo south of Arreton, at Hale Common, known as Amazon World Zoo.

Southern Vectis bus route 8 passes through the village on its way between Newport and Ryde via Sandown and Bembridge. The Downs Tour also serves the village during the summer.

Other history
Evidence of habitation during Bronze Age Britain are the "two round barrows, the larger, some 9 feet high, known locally as Michael Morey's Hump".

The Arreton church of St. George was first begun in the Norman era. The monks of Quarr helped to extend the Church of St. George around 1160. A tower was added in 1299. In the fourteenth century, a brass effigy of Harry Hawles, Steward of the Island on behalf of Montecute, Earl of Salisbury, was added to the church's interior. The brass effigy is missing its head and also the coat of arms.

There is a note marking Hawle's resting place that reads:

A renowned bowling green in Arreton Parish flourished during the 16th and 17th centuries. "I have seen," wrote Sir John Oglander (1595–1648), "with my Lord Southampton at St. George's Down at bowls some thirty or forty knights and gentlemen, where our meeting was then twice every week, Tuesday and Thursday, and we had an ordinary there and card-tables."

Arreton appears as the central location, fictionalised as "Arden", in the 1889 Maxwell Gray novel, The Reproach of Annesley.

The parish of Arreton was at one time one of the largest on the Isle of Wight. In 1894, Arreton was divided into the parishes of North Arreton and South Arreton. In 1898, part of South Arreton was transferred to Godshill, and part of Godshill was transferred to South Arreton in return. North Arreton was absorbed into Whippingham in 1907.

Arreton Athletic, the village's local football team, play in Division 3 of the Isle of Wight Saturday Football League.  Watson Bull and Porter sponsor the team. The club secretary is a Mr Robert Butler.  The team is managed by Mr Steven Vanner and captained by both Mr Neil Badham and Mr Darren Plumbley. Current team affairs can be followed on the club's official website.

Governance
Arreton is part of the electoral ward called Arreton and Newchurch. At the 2011 Census the population of this ward was 3,610.

References

External links 

 Parishes: Arreton, A History of the County of Hampshire, Volume 5 (1912), pp. 139–51. Date accessed: 15 November 2006.
 Amazon Zoo World website
 

Villages on the Isle of Wight